Andrena pruni, the cherry miner, is a species of mining bee in the family Andrenidae. It is found in North America.

References

Further reading

External links

 

pruni
Insects described in 1891